AGX may stand for:

Arts and entertainment
 AGX-05 Cybuster, fictional mecha in the video game 2nd Super Robot Wars Original Generation
 AGX-04 Gerbera Tetra, fictional mobile suit in the anime series Mobile Suit Gundam 0083: Stardust Memory

Businesses and organizations
 Aviogenex, a former Serbian airline, ICAO code AGX
 AGX Resources, former name of Pacific Rubiales Energy
 AGX, a Brazilian unmanned aerial vehicles manufacturer

Science and technology
 AGX graphite, nuclear graphite
 AgX, pseudo-chemical notation for Silver halide
 Advanced Graphics eXtended, variation of PCI-based AGP port
 AGX Multiphysics, a proprietary real-time physics engine

Other uses 
 Renault AGx, a range of trucks
 Agatti Aerodrome, an airport in Lakshadweep, India, IATA code AGX
 Aghul language, ISO 639-3 code agx

See also
 AGXT, enzyme
 AG (disambiguation)